The list of ship commissionings in 1945 includes a chronological list of ships commissioned in 1945.  In cases where no official commissioning ceremony was held, the date of service entry may be used instead.


References 

1945
 Ship commissionings
 Ship commissionings
Ship commissionings